A spinning roller coaster is a roller coaster with cars that rotate on a vertical axis.

Models

Virginia Reel 
The first spinning roller coaster was the Sierra Sidewinder, first built in 1908 by Henry Riehl. Instead of trains, the ride had "tubs" with seats built around the perimeter facing inward. These tubs spun freely on their chassis as they travelled down the track, which was trough-like and similar to that of a side friction roller coaster. Virginia Reels did not have big hills or drops, but rather many sharp turns. Toward the end were two helices, and finally a drop into a dark tunnel. The last full size Virginia Reel, at Blackpool Pleasure Beach, closed in 1982.

Spinning Wild Mouse roller coasters

In 1997, the first Spinning Wild Mouse roller coaster opened at the defunct Dinosaur Beach pier at Wildwood, New Jersey. Based on the design of the Wild Mouse roller coaster, the ride features a track layout and cars similar to a Virginia Reel, except the ride is made of steel rather than wood, and the seats face in one direction instead of toward each other. The layout of the ride boasts many hairpin turns and small hops. The design, noted for its portability and small footprint, became popular at smaller amusement parks and fairs. Well known theme park installations of the ride is the now defunct Primeval Whirl at Disney's Animal Kingdom.

The Spinning Wild Mouse was first manufactured by Reverchon Industries of France. In 2003 the company merged with Italy's Zamperla, but the companies eventually split apart again and in 2006 both companies began making Spinning Wild Mouse coasters under their own names. The two companies' spinning coasters can be found in dozens of amusement parks. A similar model was introduced by Italy's Fabbri Group in 2006.

Similar spinning coasters were made by the Chinese ride company Golden Horse and the German company Maurer Söhne, whose model is called a Compact Spinning Coaster. These models feature cars with four seats divided into two rows facing away from each other.

Other spinning roller coasters
Zierer built the first modern spinning roller coaster in 1994 with the Drehgondelbahn in Freizeit-Land Geiselwind. Maurer Söhne introduced its Xtended SC spinning coasters in the late 1990s. The seat configuration is the same as Maurer Söhne's Compact Spinning Coaster, but unlike that model, the Xtended SC has large, twisted layouts with many vertical hairpin turns intended to spin the cars around and give each rider a different experience every ride. Examples include Spider at Utah's Lagoon, Winjas at Germany's Phantasialand, Spinball Whizzer at the UK's Alton Towers and Dragon's Fury at the UK's Chessington World of Adventures.

A similar ride debuted in 2004 when the first two Gerstlauer spinning coasters opened: Fairly Odd Coaster (formerly Timberland Twister) at Nickelodeon Universe inside the Mall of America, and Spinning Dragons at Worlds of Fun. These coasters have twisted track layouts similar to Maurer Söhne's Xtended SC, but the seats on Gerstlauer Spinning Coasters face towards each other, as with the Virginia Reel.

In 1995 Intamin debuted a spinning coaster with trains instead of individual cars: Comet Express at Lotte World in Seoul, South Korea. The trains have eight cars, with each car's two seats side by side. Like the Maurer Söhne and Gerstlauer spinning coasters, this "twist and turn c oaster" features a twisted track layout. Three of these models have been built around the world.

Another spinning coaster with trains, Euro-Mir, was built by MACK Rides of Germany in 1997 at Europa-Park. The trains consist of four cars with four seats divided into two rows facing away from each other. The coaster has a twisted track layout that is built around five cylindrical towers. MACK opened a second coaster of this type, Sierra Sidewinder, at Knott's Berry Farm in 2007. 

In 2018, Silver Dollar City opened Time Traveler, the world's first "Xtreme Spinning Coaster." Also created by MACK, this ride consists of a more thrilling layout than other spinning coasters of the time, with a vertical drop directly out of the station, many bunny hills and turns, 2 LSM launches and 2 inversions. The second ride of this type was opened 3 years later in 2021. Named The Ride to Happiness, it is located at Plopsaland De Panne in Adinkerke, Belgium.

References

External links 

RCDB's listing of spinning roller coasters
 

 
Types of roller coaster